Silla is an ancient city of Mali.  It was settled in about the 10th century AD to focus on the trans-Saharan trade.

Sources
Barry, Boubacar. Senegambia and the Atlantic Slave Trade, (Cambridge: University Press, 1998) p. 6

Former populated places in Mali